Innesoconcha princeps, also known as the banded golden glass-snail, is a species of land snail that is endemic to Australia's Lord Howe Island in the Tasman Sea.

Description
The depressedly trochoidal shell of the mature snail is 5–5.6 mm in height, with a diameter of 8.8–9.1 mm. It is very glossy and golden-brown in colour, with finely incised spiral grooves. It has a low spire; the whorls are flattened above and rounded below an angular periphery. It has an ovately lunate aperture and closed umbilicus. The animal is dark grey to black.

Distribution and habitat
The snail is known only from the summits of Mount Gower and Mount Lidgbird, where it is found in mossy gnarled cloud forest in leaf litter and the leaf sheaths of palms.

References

 
 

 
princeps
Gastropods of Lord Howe Island
Taxa named by Tom Iredale
Gastropods described in 1944